The Rebirth of a King, also known as Yue Wang Gou Jian, is a Chinese television series based on the life of King Goujian of the state of Yue in the Spring and Autumn period. Directed by Huang Jianzhong, Yuen Bun and Yanyi, the series starred Chen Baoguo, Bao Guo'an, You Yong, Li Guangjie and Zhou Yang. The series was first aired on TVB in November 2006 in Hong Kong and a year later on CCTV in mainland China.

Cast
 Chen Baoguo as King Goujian of Yue
 Bao Guo'an as Wu Zixu
 You Yong as King Fuchai of Wu
 Li Guangjie as Fan Li
 Zhou Yang as Xishi
 Yao Anlian as Bo Pi
 Zhang Tong as Wen Zhong
 Tan Xiaoyan as Goujian's wife
 Yu Jiaruo as Zheng Dan
 Wan Yaoyao as Consort Wei
 Liu Xiyuan as Lingyu
 Liu Jingjing as Yuexiu
 Geng Xiaolin as Lu Jia
 Bi Haifeng as Duan Ke
 Hu Kaizhi as younger Qiying
 Liu Xiaohai as older Qiying
 Liu Yanbin as Gongsun Ju
 Zhang Di as Ju Zhu
 Li Xianqi as Ji Ni
 Liu Lian as Ye Yong
 Guo Chao as Du Yuan, Du Ye
 Wang Xiao as Zhao Yang
 Yu Zikuan as Ou Yezi
 Liu Jun as Gan Jiang
 Yang Xiaoyang as Mo Ye
 Ren Wu as Zhongli Jian
 Zhong Lin as Master Ma
 Hou Yu as Zhong Ji
 Hu Zhiyong as General Yu
 Sun Baohai as General Gu

See also
 The Conquest (TV series)
 The Great Revival

External links
  The Rebirth of a King on Sina.com

2006 Chinese television series debuts
Television series set in the Zhou dynasty
TVB dramas
Yue (state)
Wu (state)
Chinese historical television series
Mandarin-language television shows
Television series set in the 5th century BC